The 1965–66 season was Manchester City F.C.'s seventy-fourth season of league football, and second consecutive season back in the Football League Second Division.

This season is widely believed to have been the start of Manchester City's golden era, a period largely concurrent with the reign of Joe Mercer and Malcolm Allison as managers at the club, and then of the aftermath of the break-up of the partnership. This season began City's highest concentration of silverware to seasons played - winning the Second Division for a record sixth time in this season, the club would claim the Football League First Division title, the FA Cup, the Football League Cup twice, the Charity Shield twice, and in European competition the UEFA Cup Winners' Cup all within the space of the ten seasons following.

This season also saw the club sign several players who would become iconic figures in Manchester City's history - Mike Summerbee, George Heslop, and Colin Bell were all signed near the start of the season. Not coincidentally, the season and the seasons following also saw the presence of some of the club's longest-serving players. Four of the club's ten players with the most appearances for the club played during this season - Bell, Summerbee, Alan Oakes, and Mike Doyle - and a further three of those ten - Joe Corrigan, Tommy Booth and Willie Donachie - would join within the following three seasons.

Team Kit

Football League Second Division

Results summary

Reports

FA Cup

League Cup

Squad statistics

Squad
Appearances for competitive matches only

Scorers

All

League

FA Cup

League Cup

Transfers

In

Out

See also
Manchester City F.C. seasons

References

External links
Extensive Manchester City statistics site

Manchester City F.C. seasons
Manchester City F.C.